Colonel Michael Guy Percival Willoughby, 11th Baron Middleton  (21 October 1887 – 16 November 1970), was a British peer and soldier.

Biography

Willoughby was the second son of Godfrey Willoughby, 10th Baron Middleton, and was educated at Wellington College and the Royal Military College.

In 1936, Willoughby was appointed Lord Lieutenant of the East Riding of Yorkshire.  From 1931, he was President of University College, Hull, (later the University of Hull) and was its first Chancellor from 1954 to 1970.

Military career
Graduating from the Royal Military College on 9 October 1907, Willoughby was commissioned a second lieutenant in the South Lancashire Regiment (The Prince of Wales's Volunteers). He transferred to the 17th Lancers 26 October 1907 and on 26 October 1909 to the 10th Duke of Cambridge's Own Lancers (Hodson's Horse) of the Indian Army. He was promoted lieutenant 9 January 1910.

Willoughby was stationed in India at the outbreak of the First World War, as the regiment was not selected to go overseas, but in March 1915 he was sent to Mesopotamia attached to the 16th Cavalry, being promoted acting captain on 1 June 1915 and temporary captain 1 September 1915. He also served as the 6th Cavalry Brigades Machine Gun officer January to June 1916 before returning to the 16th Cavalry. In July 1916 he was attached to the 12th Cavalry until August when he returned to India to take over the 10th Duke of Cambridge's Own Lancers (Hodson's Horse) depot at Multan, that regiment now being selected for active service. For his service in Mesopotamia he was awarded the Military Cross and was mentioned in dispatches three times (The London Gazette 5 April 1916, 19 October 1916 and 12 June 1917). 

He was promoted from acting captain to captain 9 October 1916, later to be antedated to 1 September 1915.  While at Multan he led two scratch squadrons of the regiment on the Marri punitive expedition between March and April 1918 and appointed acting major commanding the depot 28 January to 12 August 1918. He was relieved of command of the depot in August 1918. He was acting major again whilst second in command of a regiment 26 October 1918 to 11 February 1919 and promoted brevet major 3 June 1919 and major 9 October 1922.

Willoughby resigned his commission 1 November 1923.  His elder brother had been killed at the Battle of Jutland in 1916 and so on the death of his father in 1924, Willoughby inherited the barony.

Lord Middleton rose through the ranks and became associated with Territorial regiments of the East Riding of Yorkshire. He first joined the Green Howards as a lieutenant colonel and was promoted colonel in 1928. He commanded the 5th and 30th Battalions of the East Yorkshire Regiment during the Second World War.

Marriage and children
On 28 April 1920, Lord Middleton married Angela Florence Alfreda Hall, a daughter of Charles Hall, of Eddlethorpe.  The couple had four children:

 Digby Michael Godfrey John Willoughby, 12th Baron Middleton, MC (born 1 May 1921, died 27 May 2011)
 Hon. Angela Hermione Ida Willoughby (born 5 May 1924)
 Hon. Jean Elizabeth Mary Willoughby (born 26 January 1928, died 11 November 2008), married Sir Fergus Matheson, 7th Baronet and had issue.
 Brigadier Hon. Henry Ernest Christopher Willoughby (born 12 June 1932, died 12 July 2009)

In 1957, Lord Middleton was appointed a Knight of the Garter (KG).  On his death in 1970, his barony passed to his elder son.

References

Burke's Peerage & Gentry, 107th edition
Obituary of Lord Middleton, The Daily Telegraph, 15 June 2011

1887 births
1970 deaths
British Indian Army officers
Indian Army personnel of World War I
British Army personnel of World War II
East Yorkshire Regiment officers
Knights of the Garter
Knights of the Order of St John
Lord-Lieutenants of the East Riding of Yorkshire
Recipients of the Military Cross
South Lancashire Regiment officers
17th Lancers officers
Green Howards officers
Graduates of the Royal Military College, Sandhurst
Michael 11